Mitino may refer to:

 Mitino District
 Mitino (Moscow Metro)